Where I Stand is the second studio album by American country music singer George Ducas. It was released in January 1997 on Capitol Records Nashville. The album includes the singles "Every Time She Passes By" and "Long Trail of Tears," which respectively reached No. 57 and No. 55 on the U.S. Billboard country singles charts.

Track listing
"Every Time She Passes By" (George Ducas, Michael P. Heeney) – 3:30
"Long Trail of Tears" (Ducas, Heeney) – 2:59
"I'm Pretending" (Buddy Miller, Julie Miller) – 3:27
"You're Only My Everything" (Ducas, Heeney) – 3:51
"You Could've Fooled Me" (Tommy Lee James, Dennis Morgan) – 4:08
"Tricky Moon" (Ducas, Tia Sillers) – 3:27
"Stay the Night" (Ducas, Sillers) – 4:20
"The Invisible Man" (Ducas, Heeney) – 4:37
"Heartaches and Dreams" (Ducas, Kostas) – 3:09
"I'd Be Lying" (Rick Bowles, Josh Leo, Terry McBride) – 4:01

Personnel
 Richard Bennett – acoustic guitar, electric guitar, keyboards, piano, tambourine
 George Ducas – acoustic guitar, lead vocals, backing vocals
 Dan Dugmore – acoustic guitar, steel guitar
 Steve Ebe – drums
 Vince Gill – backing vocals
 Tony Harrell – keyboards, piano
 Troy Von Hoefen – acoustic guitar
 Frank Lawrence (Hussar) backing vocals
 Tommy Lee James – backing vocals
 Bill Lloyd – electric guitar
 Jerry Dale McFadden – keyboards, piano
 Buddy Miller – acoustic guitar
 Greg Morrow – drums, tambourine
 Al Perkins – steel guitar
 Kim Richey – backing vocals
 Hank Singer – fiddle
 Harry Stinson – backing vocals
 Billy Thomas – backing vocals
 Glenn Worf – bass guitar

References
[ Where I Stand] at AllMusic

1997 albums
Capitol Records albums
George Ducas (singer) albums
Albums produced by Richard Bennett (guitarist)